In aviation, aircraft ground handling defines the servicing of an aircraft while it is on the ground and (usually) parked at a terminal gate of an airport.

Overview

Many airlines subcontract ground handling to airports, handling agents or even to another airline.  According to the International Air Transport Association (IATA), conservative estimates indicate airlines outsource more than 50 per cent of the ground handling that takes place at the world's airports. Ground handling addresses the many service requirements of an airliner between the time it arrives at a terminal gate and the time it departs on its next flight. Speed, efficiency, and accuracy are important in ground handling services in order to minimize the turnaround time (the time during which the aircraft must remain parked at the gate). Faster turnarounds for lower ground times are correlated to better profits.

Airlines with less-frequent service or fewer resources at a particular location sometimes subcontract ground handling or on-call aircraft maintenance to another airline, as it is a short-term cheaper alternative to setting up its own ground handling or maintenance capabilities.

Airlines may participate in an industry-standard Mutual Assistance Ground Service Agreement (MAGSA). The MAGSA is published by the Air Transport Association (the current version is from 1981) and is used by airlines to assess prices for maintenance and support to aircraft at so-called MAGSA Rates, which are updated annually based on changes in the U.S. Producer Price Index. Airlines may choose to contract for ground handling services under the terms of a Standard Ground Handling Agreement (SGHA) published in the International Air Transport Association (IATA) Airport Handling Manual. Airlines may also contract for ground handling services under non-standard terms.

Most ground services are not directly related to the actual flying of the aircraft, and instead involve other tasks. The major categories of ground handling services are described below.

Cabin service
The primary aim of this service offering is to ensure passenger comfort. While cabin cleaning comprises the bulk of the effort, it also includes tasks such as replenishing onboard consumables (soap, tissues, toilet paper, reading materials) and washable items like pillows and blankets.

Catering

Catering includes the unloading of unused food and drink from the aircraft, and the loading of fresh food and drink for passengers and crew. In flight airline meals are delivered at the seats in airline service trolleys. Empty or trash-filled trolley from the previous flight are replaced with fresh ones.  Meals are prepared mostly on the ground in order to minimize the amount of preparation (apart from chilling or reheating) required in flight.

While some airlines provide their own catering, others have either owned catering companies in the past and divested themselves of the companies, or have outsourced their catering to third-party companies. Airline catering sources include the following companies:

Airline Services & Logistics PLC(EPZE)
Atlas Catering (Royal Air Maroc's catering service)
Cara Operations
Cathay Pacific's Cathay Pacific Catering Services
Chelsea Food Services
DHL
Gate Gourmet
KLM's KLM Catering Services
LSG Sky Chefs
Sky Cafe’
Q Catering (Qantas)
SATS Food
Servair
Thai Airways's Thai Catering Services
United Airlines

Ramp service

This includes services on the ramp or apron, such as:
Guiding the aircraft into and out of the parking position (by way of aircraft marshalling),
Towing with pushback tractors
Lavatory drainage
 Water cartage (typically non-potable for lavatory sink use)
Air conditioning (more common for smaller aircraft)
 Airstart units (for starting engines)
 Luggage handling, usually by means of beltloaders and baggage carts
Gate checked luggage, often handled on the tarmac as passengers disembark
Air cargo handling, usually by means of cargo dollies and cargo loaders
Catering trucks
 Refueling, which may be done with a refueling tanker truck or refueling pumper
 Ground power (so that engines need not be running to provide aircraft power on the ground)
 Passenger stairs (used instead of an aerobridge or airstairs, some budget airlines use both to improve turnaround speed)
 Wheelchair lifts, if required
 Hydraulic mules  (units that provide hydraulic power to an aircraft externally)
Deicing

Passenger service

This includes services inside the airport terminal such as:
Providing check-in counter services for the passengers departing on the customer airlines.
Providing gate arrival and departure services. The agents are required to meet a flight on arrival as well as provide departure services including boarding passengers and closing the flight.
Staffing the transfer counters, customer service counters and airline lounges.

Field operation service
This service dispatches the aircraft, maintains communication with the rest of the airline operation at the airport and with Air Traffic Control.

List of notable handling agents

Asia

Bangladesh
  Biman Bangladesh Airlines

India
  Air India Airport Services Limited - All Indian Airports - presently providing services at 74 airports in India.
  Air India SATS Airport Services Private Limited - Delhi, Hyderabad, Bangalore, Trivandrum, Mangalore, Cochin.
  LAS Ground Force Handling - Goa, Udaipur & Bagdogra
  Bhadra International India Pvt Ltd - Chennai 
  Bird Worldwide Flight Services Pvt Ltd - Delhi, Mumbai & Kochi
  Livewel Aviation -Mumbai & Delhi 
  Globe Ground India - Ahmadabad, Bangalore 
  Indo Thai Airport Management Services Pvt Ltd - Amritsar, Lucknow & Mohali
  Agile Airport Services Pvt Ltd - presently providing services at 8 airports in India.
  Qatar Aviation Services - Delhi

Hong Kong
  Cathay Pacific
  Hong Kong Airport Services (parent company: Cathay Pacific)
  Hong Kong Aviation Ground Services (parent company: Hong Kong Airlines)
  Jardine Aviation Services (parent company: Jardine Matheson)
  SATS HK
  United Airlines

Japan
  All Nippon Airways
  JAL Ground Service
  Japan Airport Ground Handling
  Japan Airport Service Co., Ltd.
  International Air Cargo Terminal Co., Ltd.

Korea
  Korea Airport Service
  Asiana Airport Service
  DongBo Airport Service

Laos
  Andaman Aviation Services

Nepal
 Nepal Airlines - Kathmandu

Pakistan
  Pakistan International Airlines
  Shaheen Airport Services (Pvt) Ltd
  Gerry’s dnata (Pvt) Ltd
  Royal Airport Services (Pvt) Ltd

Singapore
  SATS Ltd
  dnata Singapore
  Universal Aviation

Philippines
  Airmach Aviation
  1 Aviation
  dnata Philippines
  MacroAsia Airport Services Corporation
  MDFS PHILIPPINES
  Philippine Airport Ground Support Solutions

Taiwan
  China Airlines Co., Ltd.
  Taoyuan International Airport Services Co., Ltd.
  Taiwan Airport Service Co., Ltd.
  Evergreen Airlines Service
  Taiwan Sky Ground Service Co., Ltd.

Thailand
  Wingspan Services Co., Ltd.
  BAGS Ground Services Co., Ltd.
  Andaman Aviation Services
  AOTGA AOT Ground Aviation Services Co., Ltd.

The Caribbean

Barbados
  Caribbean Aircraft Handling Co., Ltd.

Jamaica
  AJAS Aviation Services
  Eulen America
  GCG Ground Services Jamaica
  Jamaica Dispatch Services Ltd.

St. Vincent and the Grenadines
  Caribbean Aviation Management, Inc.

Europe

Belgium
  Aviapartner

Cyprus 
  LGS Handling
 CTT Aviation Ltd.
  SWISSPORT

Denmark
  SAS - SGH Ground handling

Finland
  AIRPRO

France
  Groupe Europe Handling
 3S Alyzia
 AviaPartner
 Ladybird Ground Services
 Samsic Assistance
 Servair

Greece 
  Goldair
  Skyserv

Ireland
  Sky Handling Partner

Italy
  Airport Handling

Latvia
  HAVAS Ground Handling Co.

Lithuania
  Baltic Ground Services
  Litcargus

Netherlands 
  KLM groundhandling

Norway 
  Menzies Aviation
  SAS Ground Handling

Poland
  Baltic Ground Services
  LS Airport Services
  Welcome Airport Services

Portugal
  Groundforce Portugal
  Portway

Sweden
  SAS Ground Handling
  AVIATOR Ground Handling
  Menzies Aviation

Switzerland
  Swissport
  dnata
  AAS

Turkey
  Turkish Ground Services
  HAVAS Ground Handling Co.
  Celebi Ground Handling Inc.
  FUGO Ground Handling Inc.

United Kingdom 
  Airline Services
  American Airlines Handling (Subsidiary of American Airlines)
  Aviator Nordic
  Azzurra / Premiere Handling
  British Airways
  Cobalt Ground Solutions
  DHL
  Dnata
  Gatwick Ground Services (Subsidiary of British Airways)
  Jet2 Handling
  Menzies Aviation
  Signature Flight Support
  Star Handling
  Swissport GB
  World Flight Services (WFS)
  Premiere Executive Handling Ltd
  ASC Handling Services

Middle East
  ASE – Egypt Member ASE Group
  ASE – UAE Member Of ASE Group
   SE – Morocco Member Of ASE Group
  New Star Aviation Services
  dnata (Also active in other countries)
  Egypt Air Ground Services
  Saudi Private Aviation-SPA
  Saudia Cargo
  Saudia Ground Services-SGS
  HAVAS Ground Handling Co.
  Oman Air
  Shaheen Airport Services
  Royal Airport Services
  Gerry's dnata
  Airways Flight Support Services
  BAS (Bahrain Airport Services)
  QAS (Qatar Aviation Services)
  El Al
  Laufer GHI
  QAS (Quality Airport Services)
  Aerohandling

North and Central America

Canada
  Swissport
  Airport Terminal Services (ATS)
  Menzies Aviation
  GTA Dnata
  Air North
  Strategic Aviation
  Global Aviation
  Ironman Holdings
  Allied Aviation
  Air Canada

Cuba
  ECASA

Mexico
  Kion de Mexico
  Aeromexico Servicios

United States
  Airport Terminal Services (ATS)
  DAL Global Services
  Dynamic Aviation Services (DAS)
  Envoy Air
  United Ground Express
  McGee Air Services
  Mickey Heart
  Universal Aviation
  Simplicity
  Piedmont Airlines
  SkyWest Airlines
  G2 Secure Staff
  Trego/Dugan Aviation

South America

Peru
  Swissport
  Talma Servicios Aeroportuarios

Uruguay
  Candysur S.A.

See also 
 Flight kitchen
 Ground support equipment

References

Further reading

External links